Donner Valley is a small, mainly ice-free valley located north-northeast of Mount Thundergut in the Asgard Range, Victoria Land. It was named by the New Zealand Antarctic Place-Names Committee, presumably in association with nearby Mount Thundergut, "donner" being a German word for "thunder."

References 

Valleys of Victoria Land
McMurdo Dry Valleys